Self-Portrait Aged 24 is an oil on canvas self-portrait painting by Jean-Auguste-Dominique Ingres, executed in 1804. first exhibited at the Paris Salon of 1806. The painting is now held in the Musée Condé and is considered to be either the 1804 portrait with modifications by the artist from 1851 or an autograph copy by Ingres of a lost work. It is his earliest self-portrait, and he extensively reworked it between 1804 and 1851. 

The original appearance of the painting was recorded in an 1806 engraving by Jean-Louis Potrelle (which Ingres himself retouched), an 1807 copy by Marie-Anne-Julie Forestier and a photograph of the original taken by Charles Marville c. 1849. Its composition refers to  Renaissance portraiture, especially Raphael's Portrait of Bindo Altoviti.

References
 

1804 paintings
1851 paintings
Portraits by Jean-Auguste-Dominique Ingres
Ingres